Hoot Owl may refer to:
 Barred owl or great horned owl, types of owl
 Hoot Owl, Oklahoma, a town
 Hoot Owl, Master of Disguise, a picture book by Sean Taylor

See also
 Hoot the Owl from Giggle and Hoot, Australian children's television program
 Hoots the Owl, Sesame Street Muppet character